The United States justified its original attempt at establishing federal trademarks by pointing to the Copyright Clause in the Constitution. The Trade Mark Act of 1870 (within the Copyright Act of 1870) and the Trade Mark Act of 1876 were tested in a series of United States Supreme Court cases, called the Trade-Mark Cases, and ruled unconstitutional because that clause did not cover trademarks.

Before being ruled unconstitutional, they were the subjects of other Supreme Court cases: Delaware & Hudson Canal Co. v. Clark, Amoskeag Manufacturing Co. v. D. Trainer & Sons, and McLean v. Fleming.

The Trade Mark Act of 1881, instead, justified its authority under the Commerce Clause.

Further reading
 "Early Developments in United States Trademark Law" by Ross Housewright

References

United States federal trademark legislation